High Point is an unincorporated community in High Point Township, Decatur County, Iowa, United States.

History
High Point's population was 31 in 1925.

References

Unincorporated communities in Decatur County, Iowa
Unincorporated communities in Iowa